Mervyn William Dudley (31 May 1917 – 22 April 2013) was an Australian rules footballer who played with South Melbourne and Footscray in the Victorian Football League (VFL).

Dudley returned to the Numurkah Football Club as captain / coach in 1946 and won the 1946 Murray Football League best and fairest award, the O'Dwyer Medal.

Notes

External links 

1917 births
2013 deaths
Australian rules footballers from Victoria (Australia)
Sydney Swans players
Western Bulldogs players
Numurkah Football Club players